East Hall may refer to:

East Hall (Ocala, Florida), listed on the National Register of Historic Places in Marion County, Florida
East Hall (Tufts University), a historic academic building on the grounds of Tufts University, in Medford, Massachusetts
East Hall (Kalamazoo, Michigan), listed on the National Register of Historic Places in Kalamazoo County, Michigan
East Hall (Institute, West Virginia), listed on the National Register of Historic Places in Kanawha County, West Virginia